Astroblepus praeliorum is a species of catfish of the family Astroblepidae. It can be found on the Marañón River in Peru.

References

Bibliography
Eschmeyer, William N., ed. 1998. Catalog of Fishes. Special Publication of the Center for Biodiversity Research and Information, num. 1, vol. 1–3. California Academy of Sciences. San Francisco, California, United States. 2905. .

Astroblepus
Freshwater fish of Peru
Fish described in 1942